The Mid-America Men's Volleyball Intercollegiate Conference (MAMVIC) was an NAIA men's volleyball-only conference. At its largest, the MAMVIC was divided into four conferences: Great Lakes, National, North, and South. It was formerly the NAIA division of MIVA.

Members at dissolution

Great Lakes Division

National Division

North Division

South Division

Former members

References

External links
 

College volleyball in the United States
Defunct NAIA conferences
Sports leagues disestablished in 2016